Raúl Pérez (21 June 1915 – 26 July 1967) was a Chilean footballer. He played in four matches for the Chile national football team from 1941 to 1942. He was also part of Chile's squad for the 1941 South American Championship.

References

External links
 

1915 births
1967 deaths
Chilean footballers
Chile international footballers
Place of birth missing
Association football forwards